Steve Daley (born 15 April 1953) is an English former footballer, who played as a midfielder. His English record transfer to Manchester City in 1979 was later described as "the biggest waste of money in football history". The Manchester City manager Malcolm Allison and chairman Peter Swales subsequently accused each other of inflating the fee.

Career

Wolverhampton Wanderers
Daley began his football career as an apprentice at Wolverhampton Wanderers, after arriving at the club via their feeder team Wath Wanderers based in Yorkshire. He signed professionally in 1971, and made his first-team debut later that year on 18 September, coming on as substitute in a 2–0 defeat at Newcastle United.

He won a League Cup winners medal with the club in 1974 and played in their run through to the 1972 UEFA Cup Final, scoring a vital goal in the semi final against Ferencváros inside the first minute. That goal still holds the record for being the fastest goal ever scored in European football cup competitions. He was an ever-present in the 1976–77 season, scoring 13 goals, and a further eight the following season saw him receive an England 'B' call up. He played six times for the 'B' side during 1978, scoring twice (against Singapore and Czechoslovakia 'B').

Manchester City
In September 1979, he was transferred to Manchester City for a fee of £1,437,500 – an English record, and equivalent to £7,328,000 in 2019. Daley struggled at Maine Road, and gained a reputation as a big-money misfit.

After Manchester City
Twenty months later he was transferred to the Seattle Sounders of the North American Soccer League for £300,000 – little more than a fifth of his original transfer cost. He made the NASL All-Star second team in 1982 and 1983 before moving back to Britain.

Daley joined Burnley, but soon returned to North America to play for the San Diego Sockers. His professional playing career ended at Walsall in 1986, although he continued to turn out for non-league sides such as Lye Town and Kettering Town.

After hanging up his boots, Daley briefly managed non-league Telford United, Bromsgrove Rovers and Bilston Town, before quitting football to join the pub trade. He has since been working as a brewery sales manager, supplying catering equipment to the industry. Also an established after-dinner speaker, Daley recalls his career in football with honesty and humour.

References

External links
Steve Daley's website
NASL/MISL stats

1953 births
Living people
Burnley F.C. players
English footballers
English expatriate footballers
England B international footballers
Major Indoor Soccer League (1978–1992) players
Manchester City F.C. players
North American Soccer League (1968–1984) players
North American Soccer League (1968–1984) indoor players
San Diego Sockers (NASL) players
San Diego Sockers (original MISL) players
Seattle Sounders (1974–1983) players
Walsall F.C. players
Wolverhampton Wanderers F.C. players
Association football midfielders
Bilston Town F.C. managers
English expatriate sportspeople in the United States
Expatriate soccer players in the United States
English football managers